"The Dogs of War" is a song by Pink Floyd from their 1987 album, A Momentary Lapse of Reason. It was released as a promotional single from the album. Live versions have an extended intro, an extended middle solo for the saxophone, a guitar and sax duel and a longer outro as compared to the album version. The track was a minor rock radio hit in the US and reached #16 on MTV's Video Countdown in May 1988.

"The Dogs of War" describes politicians orchestrating wars, suggesting the major influence behind war is money.

Composition
Musically, the song follows a twelve-bar blues structure in C minor, only with significantly different chord changes. A standard blues song in C minor would progress as C minor, F minor, C minor, G (major or minor), F minor, and back to C minor. "The Dogs of War", instead, progresses in this way: C minor, Eb minor, C minor, Ab seventh, F minor, and back to C minor. All minor chords include the seventh.

Singer David Gilmour often approaches the C minor chord by singing on the diminished fifth, G flat, before descending to the fourth, minor third, and root. This melody is also compatible with the next chord, Eb minor, in which G flat is the minor third. It also appears in the Ab seventh chord, as the dominant seventh.

The majority of the song is in a slow 12/8 time. After a bluesy guitar solo, the song switches to a fast 4/4 tempo for the saxophone solo. This is not unlike what happens in "Money", a minor-key blues-based song from The Dark Side of the Moon, in which a saxophone solos over the song's predominant 7/4 tempo before switching to a faster 4/4 tempo for the guitar solo. "The Dogs of War" also imitates "Money" in its ending sequence, with a "call and response" between Gilmour's voice and his guitar.

Video
The video for the track composed of the backdrop film directed by Storm Thorgerson which depicted German Shepherds with yellow eyes running through a war zone plus a live recording and concert footage filmed during the band's three night run at The Omni in Atlanta, Georgia in November 1987 directed by Lawrence Jordan (who has directed concert films for Rush, Mariah Carey and Billy Joel). Videos for "On the Turning Away" and "One Slip" were also filmed at this concert.

Personnel on studio version
David Gilmour – guitar, vocals

Additional musicians:

Jon Carin – keyboards
Tony Levin – bass guitar
Carmine Appice – drums
Bill Payne – Hammond organ
Scott Page – saxophone 
Tom Scott – saxophone
Darlene Koldenhoven – backing vocals
Carmen Twillie – backing vocals
Phyllis St. James – backing vocals
Donny Gerrard – backing vocals

Personnel on live versions
David Gilmour – lead guitar, vocals and vocalisations
Nick Mason – drums and percussion
Richard Wright – organ and synthesizer

with:

Guy Pratt – bass
Tim Renwick – rhythm guitar
Jon Carin – keyboards and effects
Gary Wallis – percussion
Scott Page – saxophone
Margret Taylor, Rachel Fury, Durga McBroom, Roberta Freeman (video version) and Lorelei McBroom (video version) – backing vocals

Cover version
Slovenian industrial group Laibach covered the song on their album, NATO (1994).

See also
List of anti-war songs
One World or None

References

External links

1987 songs
Pink Floyd songs
Anti-war songs
Songs written by David Gilmour
Song recordings produced by Bob Ezrin
Song recordings produced by David Gilmour
CBS Records singles
Columbia Records singles